Kitchen Party can refer to:
Kitchen Party (film), a 1997 film written and directed by Gary Burns
Kitchen Party (group), a British girl group
Freeman Dre and the Kitchen Party, a band from Toronto, Ontario